Namsai may refer to:

Namsai, Arunachal Pradesh, India
Namsai district, Arunachal Pradesh
Namsai, Burma